The Young Christian Democrats (KDU) is the youth organization of the Christian Democrats in Sweden.

KDU was founded at a conference in Sundsvall 1966. Initially the name of the organization was Christian Democratic Youth (Kristen Demokratisk Ungdom) but were later changed.

List of chairmen
Bernt Olsson 1966-1970
Alf Svensson 1970-1973
Mats Odell 1975-1981
Anders Andersson 1981-1984
Bert-Inge Karlsson 1984-1986
Stefan Attefall 1986-1989
Göran Holmström 1989-1992
Hans Åström Eklind 1992-1996
Amanda Agestav (Grönlund) 1996-1997
Magnus Jacobsson 1997-1999
Magnus Berntsson 1999-2001
Jakob Forssmed 2001-2004
Erik Slottner 2004-2005
Ella Bohlin 2005-2008
Charlie Weimers 2008-2011
Aron Modig 2011-2013
Sara Skyttedal 2013-2016
Christian Carlsson 2016-2018
Martin Hallander 2018-2020
Nike Örbrink 2020-

Honorary chairman
Alf Svensson 2021-

Current leadership

Chairwoman: Nike Örbrink,

1st Vice Chairmen: Stefan Sarmes,

2nd Vice Chairman: Nataneal Kvidal,

References

External links
Kristdemokratiska Ungdomsförbundet in Swedish

Youth wings of political parties in Sweden
Christian Democrats (Sweden)
Youth organizations established in 1966
1966 establishments in Sweden